Club Deportivo Cieza is a Spanish football team based in Murcia, in the autonomous community of Region of Murcia. Founded in 1970 it plays in Regional Preferente, holding home games at Estadio Municipal La Arboleja, with a capacity of 3,500 seats.

Season to season

2 seasons in Segunda División B
27 seasons in Tercera División

Honours
Tercera División: 1986–87, 1992–93

Famous players
 David Karanka

External links
Official website 
Futbolme team profile 

 
Football clubs in the Region of Murcia
Association football clubs established in 1970
1970 establishments in Spain